"Take It Easy (Love Nothing)" is a single by Bright Eyes, released in October 2004. It, along with "Lua", took the top two spots on Billboard magazine's Hot Singles Sales chart, something that had not been accomplished by one artist since 1997. The title song appears on the 2005 album, Digital Ash in a Digital Urn.

The single is the 69th release of Saddle Creek Records.

Track listing
"Take It Easy (Love Nothing)" (Conor Oberst) – 3:24
"Burn Rubber" (Simon Joyner) – 2:43
"Cremation" (Oberst) – 4:45

Personnel
Jason Boesel – drums, car doors, percussion (1–3)
Clay Leverett – car doors, percussion (2–3)
Mike Mogis – guitar, banjo, dobro, keyboards, bass, Wurlitzer (1–3)
Conor Oberst – guitar, baritone, bass, keyboards, Wurlitzer, voice (1–3)
Jimmy Tamborello – drum program (1)
Digital Audio Engine – drum programming (1–3)

External links
 Listen to "Take It Easy (Love Nothing)" on NPR's All Songs Considered (RealPlayer, Windows Media Player)

2004 singles
Bright Eyes (band) songs
Saddle Creek Records singles
2004 songs
Songs written by Conor Oberst